Agustín Mazzola (born 16 July 1998) is an Argentine professional footballer who plays as a defender.

Career
Mazzola's career started with Santamarina. He was an unused substitute under Héctor Arzubialde four times in the 2017–18 Primera B Nacional campaign, as he was in 2018–19 for a fixture with Chacarita Juniors in November 2018. However, this time his senior debut arrived four months later as Mazzola came off the substitutes bench with ten minutes remaining of a 2–0 loss away to Almagro on 30 March 2019.

Career statistics
.

References

External links

1998 births
Living people
People from Tandil
Argentine footballers
Association football defenders
Primera Nacional players
Club y Biblioteca Ramón Santamarina footballers
Sportspeople from Buenos Aires Province